Project Chariot was a 1958 US Atomic Energy Commission proposal to construct an artificial harbor at Cape Thompson on the North Slope of the U.S. state of Alaska by burying and detonating a string of nuclear devices.

History 

The project originated as part of Operation Plowshare, a research project to find peaceful uses for nuclear explosives.

The plan was championed by Edward Teller, who traveled throughout the state touting the harbor as an important economic development for America's newest state. Alaskan political leaders, newspaper editors, the state university's president, even church groups all rallied in support of the massive detonation. Congress had passed the Alaska Statehood Act just a few weeks before. An editorial in the July 24, 1960 Fairbanks News-Miner said, "We think the holding of a huge nuclear blast in Alaska would be a fitting overture to the new era which is opening for our state." Opposition came from the Inupiaq Alaska Native village of Point Hope, a few scientists engaged in environmental studies under AEC contract, and a handful of conservationists. The grassroots protest soon was picked up by organizations with national reach, such as The Wilderness Society, the Sierra Club, and Barry Commoner's Committee for Nuclear Information. In 1962, facing increased public uneasiness over the environmental risk and the potential to disrupt the lives of the Alaska Native peoples, the AEC announced that Project Chariot would be "held in abeyance." It has never been formally canceled.

In addition to the objections of the local population, no practical use of such a harbor was ever identified. The environmental studies commissioned by the AEC suggested that radioactive contamination from the proposed blast could adversely affect the health and safety of the local people, whose livelihoods were based on hunting animals. The investigations noted that radiation from worldwide fallout was moving with unusual efficiency up the food chain in the Arctic, from lichen, to caribou (which fed on lichen), to humans (for whom caribou was a primary food source).

Although the detonation never occurred, the site was radioactively contaminated by an experiment to estimate the effect on water sources of radioactive ejecta landing on tundra plants and subsequently washed down and carried away by rains. Material from a 1962 nuclear explosion at the Nevada Test Site was transported to the Chariot site in August 1962, used in several experiments, then buried. Thirty years later, the disposal was discovered in archival documents by a University of Alaska researcher. State officials immediately traveled to the site and found low levels of radioactivity at a depth of two feet (60 cm) in the burial mound. Outraged residents of the Inupiat village of Point Hope, who had experienced an unusually high rate of cancer deaths, demanded the removal of the contaminated soil, which the government did at its expense.

According to Robert Davis and co-workers, after a customer for the harbor project could not be discovered, the researchers decided to turn the project into a study on the economic impacts of nuclear fallout on the indigenous communities of Point Hope, Noatak, and Kivalina, in particular "to measure the size of bomb necessary to render a population dependent" after local food sources have become too dangerous to eat due to extreme levels of radiation.

See also
 Project Gnome

Further reading

Peter Coates, 'Project Chariot: Alaskan roots of environmentalism', Alaska History 4/2 (1989), 1-31
 
 
 Vandegraft, Douglas L Project Chariot: Nuclear Legacy of Cape Thompson. Proceedings of the U.S. Interagency Arctic Research Policy Committee Workshop on Arctic Contamination, Session A: Native People's Concerns about Arctic Contamination II: Ecological Impacts, May 6, 1993, Anchorage, Alaska
 Wedman. William, and Charles Diters. The legacy of project Chariot. Bureau of Indian Affairs, Alaska Region regional archaeology report under the National Historic Preservation Act. Undated, circa 2007.

References

External links
 

1958 in Alaska
Chariot
Peaceful nuclear explosions
Pre-statehood history of Alaska